The 2004 season was São Paulo's 75th season since club's existence. São Paulo played Campeonato Paulista, State of São Paulo league, being defeated in a single match quarterfinal by São Caetano, 0–2, at home field due advantage points in first phase. After 10 years the club return to play the continental tournament, Copa Libertadores, that were champions in 1992, 1993 and runners-up in 1994 the last participation before 2004, reached this time the semifinals where they lost to Once Caldas in away game for 1–2 after a 0–0 in Morumbi. In Campeonato Brasileiro ending the 46 rounds with a third position, but the featured unpleasant happened in 38th match against São Caetano on 27 October when the defender of adversary Serginho fell in the field near the small area of São Caetano's defence suffering a fatal cardiac arrest at 60 minutes. With announcement of his death the match was finished and the remainder was played on 3 November. In Copa Sudamericana Tricolor was eliminated by rival Santos in second stage.

Squad

Final squad

Scorers

Overall

{|class="wikitable"
|-
|Games played || 74 (10 Campeonato Paulista, 12 Copa Libertadores, 46 Campeonato Brasileiro, 4 Copa Sudamericana, 2 Friendly match)
|-
|Games won || 42 (8 Campeonato Paulista, 8 Copa Libertadores, 24 Campeonato Brasileiro, 0 Copa Sudamericana, 2 Friendly match)
|-
|Games drawn || 15 (1 Campeonato Paulista, 1 Copa Libertadores, 10 Campeonato Brasileiro, 3 Copa Sudamericana, 0 Friendly match)
|-
|Games lost || 17 (1 Campeonato Paulista, 3 Copa Libertadores, 12 Campeonato Brasileiro, 1 Copa Sudamericana, 0 Friendly match)
|-
|Goals scored || 130
|-
|Goals conceded || 66
|-
|Goal difference || +64
|-
|Best result || 7–0 (H) v Paysandu – Campeonato Brasileiro – 2004.09.28
|-
|Worst result || 0–3 (A) v LDU Quito – Copa Libertadores – 2004.03.04
|-
|Top scorer || Grafite (27 goals)
|-

Friendlies

Official competitions

Campeonato Paulista

Record

Copa Libertadores

Record

Campeonato Brasileiro

Record

Copa Sudamericana

Record

See also
São Paulo FC

References

External links
official website 

Brazilian football clubs 2004 season
2004